Unni is a 2007 Malayalam-language Indian feature film directed by Murali Nair, starring Ajith, Kumar K. Sarath in lead roles.

Cast
 Kumar K. Sarath as Unni 
 V. N. Ajith as Gopi 
 Bharathan Njarakkal
 Kodakara Sukumaran
 Leela Hari
 Likhil
 Noble
 Rajan Engakkad
 Sreedharan
 Vypin Lenin

References

External links
 

2007 films
2000s Malayalam-language films